Cyprus competed at the Winter Olympic Games for the first time at the 1980 Winter Olympics in Lake Placid, United States.

Alpine skiing

References
Official Olympic Reports
 Olympic Winter Games 1980, full results by sports-reference.com

Nations at the 1980 Winter Olympics
1980
Winter Olympics